Robert Gerbaud (27 July 1893 – 1 February 1977) was a French racing cyclist. He rode in the 1920 Tour de France.

References

1893 births
1977 deaths
French male cyclists
Place of birth missing